John G. Webster is an American electrical engineer and a founding pioneer in the field of biomedical engineering. In 2008, Professor Webster was awarded the University of Wisconsin, College of Engineering, Polygon Engineering Council Outstanding Instructor Award.

Education 

1953 BSc   (Elec. Eng.) Cornell University
1965 MSc   (Elec. Eng.) University of Rochester
1967 PhD   (Elec. Eng.) University of Rochester

Educational Experiments

1953–54 Fulbright Fellow, University of Munich
1963–67 NIH Predoctoral Fellow, Univ. of Rochester, NY
1967 Instructor in Electrical Eng., Univ. of Rochester, NY
1967–70 Asst. Prof. of Elec. Eng., University of Wisconsin-Madison
1970 ASEE-NASA Summer Faculty Fellow, Stanford-Ames
1970–73 Assoc. Prof. of Electrical Eng., Univ. of Wisconsin-Madison
1976–80 Director of Biomedical Eng. Ctr., Univ. of Wisconsin-Madison
1973–1999 Professor of Elec. & Computer Eng., Univ. of Wisconsin-Madison
1999–2001 Professor of Biomedical Eng., Univ. of Wisconsin-Madison
2001–present Professor Emeritus of Biomedical Eng., Univ. of Wisconsin-Madison Supervised 24 Ph.D. and 67 M.S. theses

Industrial Experiments

1954–55 Research Engineer, North American Aviation
1955–59 Head, Instrumentation Group, Boeing Airplane Co.
1959–61 Head, Telemetry System Test Group, Radiation, Inc.
1961–62 Staff Engineer, Display Group, Mitre Corp.
1962–63 Staff Engineer, Computer Display, IBM Corp.
2005–present Director of Research, Bahr Management, Inc.

Professional Society Activities

1979–85 Associate Editor of IEEE Transactions on Biomedical Engineering
1979–84 Administrative Committee of IEEE Engineering in Medicine and Biology Society
1979–93 Instrumentation Section Co-editor of Annals of Biomedical Engineering
1987 present Editorial Board of Medical & Biological Engineering & Computing
1987–2008 Editorial Board of Physiological Measurement
1990–95 Editorial Review Board of Journal of Clinical Engineering
1988–89 Chairman of Fellows Committee of IEEE Engineering in Medicine and Biology Society
1990–91 Nominating Committee of IEEE Engineering in Medicine and Biology Society
1999–2000 Fellows Committee of IEEE Engineering in Medicine and Biology Society

Books 

 Jacobson, B., and J. G. Webster, Medicine and clinical engineering, Prentice-Hall, Englewood Cliffs, NJ, 1977.
 Webster, J. G. and A. M. Cook (eds.), Clinical engineering:  principles and practices, Prentice-Hall, Englewood Cliffs, NJ, 1979.
 Tompkins, W. J., and J. G. Webster (eds.), Design of microcomputer-based medical instrumentation, Prentice-Hall, Englewood Cliffs, NJ, 1981.
 Cook, A. M., and J. G. Webster (eds.), Therapeutic medical devices:  application and design, Prentice-Hall, Englewood Cliffs, NJ, 1982.
 Webster, J. G., A. M. Cook, W. J. Tompkins, and G. C. Vanderheiden (eds.), Electronic devices for rehabilitation, Wiley, New York, 1985.
 Tompkins, W. J., and J. G. Webster (eds.), Interfacing sensors to the IBM PC, Prentice all, Englewood Cliffs, NJ, 1988.
 Webster, J. G. (ed.), Tactile sensors for robotics and medicine, John Wiley & Sons, New York, 1988. 
 Webster, J. G., Transducers and sensors, An IEEE/EAB Individual Learning Program, IEEE, Piscataway, NJ, 1989.
 Webster, J. G. (ed.), Electrical impedance tomography, Adam Hilger, Bristol, England, 1990.
 Webster, J. G. (ed.), Teaching design in electrical engineering, Educational Activities Board, IEEE, Piscataway, NJ, 1990.
 Webster, J. G. (ed.), Prevention of pressure sores: engineering and clinical aspects, Adam Hilger, Bristol, England, 1991.
 Webster, J. G. (ed.), Design of cardiac pacemakers, IEEE Press, Piscataway, NJ, 1995.
 Webster, J. G. (ed.), Design of pulse oximeters, IOP Publishing, Bristol, UK, 1997.
 Pallás-Areny, R., and J. G. Webster, Analog signal processing, John Wiley & Sons, New York, 1999.
 Webster, J. G. (ed.), The measurement, instrumentation and sensors handbook, CRC Press, Boca Raton, FL, 1999.
 Webster, J. G. (ed.), Encyclopedia of electrical and electronic engineering, John Wiley & Sons, New York, 1999.
 Webster, J. G. (ed.), Mechanical variables measurement: solid, fluid, and thermal, CRC Press, Boca Raton, FL, 2000.
 Pallás-Areny, R., and J. G. Webster, Sensors and signal conditioning, Second edition, John Wiley & Sons, New York, 2001.
 Webster, J. G. (ed.), Minimally invasive medical technology, IOP Publishing, Bristol, UK, 2001. John G. Webster 17
 Webster, J. G. (ed.), Electrical measurement, signal processing, and displays, CRC Press, Boca Raton, FL, 2004.
 Webster, J. G. (ed.), Bioinstrumentation, John Wiley & Sons, New York, 2004.
 Webster, J. G. (ed.), Encyclopedia of medical devices and instrumentation, Second edition, John Wiley & Sons, New York, 2006.
 Webster, J. G. (ed.), Medical instrumentation: application and design, Fourth edition, John Wiley & Sons, Hoboken, NJ, 2009.

Medical Instrumentation: Application and Design is considered the classic textbook in the field.

Honors and awards

2010 Emeritus Fellow, Biomedical Engineering Society
2008 University of Wisconsin, College of Engineering, Polygon Engineering Council Outstanding Instructor Award
2005 Fellow, World Innovation Foundation
2004 Thomson ISI Highly Cited
2001 IEEE EMBS Career Achievement Award
2000 University of Wisconsin, College of Engineering, Benjamin Smith Reynolds Award for Excellence in Teaching Engineers
2000 University of Wisconsin, College of Engineering, Polygon Engineering Council Outstanding Instructor Award
2000 IEEE Third Millennium Medal
1999 Fellow, Institute of Physics
1999 ASEE/Engineering Libraries Division, Award for Best Reference Work
1999 University of Wisconsin, College of Engineering, Polygon Engineering Council Outstanding Instructor Award
1999 University of Wisconsin, Department of Electrical and Computer Engineering, Holdridge Award for Excellence in Teaching
1996 Association for the Advancement of Medical Instrumentation, AAMI Foundation Laufman-Greatbatch Prize
1996 University of Wisconsin Chancellor's Award for Excellence in Teaching
1994 ASEE/Biomedical Engineering Division, Theo C. Pilkington Outstanding Educator Award
1993 ASEE Centennial Certificate of Recognition
1992 Fellow, American Institute for Medical and Biological Engineering
1986–90 NIH Surgery and Bioengineering Study Section
1986 Fellow, Institute of Electrical and Electronics Engineers, 1997 Life Fellow
1979 Fellow, Instrument Society of America, 1994 Life FellowJohn G. Webster 3
1978 ASEE Western Electric Fund Award
1974 ISA Donald P. Eckman Education Award
1971–76 NIH Research Career Development Award 

Webster is currently professor emeritus in the College of Engineering at the University of Wisconsin–Madison. He last taught Biomedical Engineering 310: Introduction to Bioinstrumentation during spring 2015.

He first proposed the idea of electrical impedance tomography as a medical imaging technique in a publication in 1978.

In his spare time, Webster works with undergraduate biomedical engineering design teams at the University of Wisconsin-Madison, including ongoing projects with impedance cardiography and atrial fibrillation.

References

Living people
American electrical engineers
Fellow Members of the IEEE
Fellows of the American Institute for Medical and Biological Engineering
Fellows of the Biomedical Engineering Society
Year of birth missing (living people)